Roman Meshcheryakov (born 2 September 1978) is a retired Russian super-heavyweight weightlifter. He held the Russian title in 2000 and 2001 and won a silver medal at the 2001 World Championships.

References

1978 births
Living people
Russian male weightlifters
World Weightlifting Championships medalists
People from Novokuznetsk
Sportspeople from Kemerovo Oblast
20th-century Russian people
21st-century Russian people